YIA may refer to:
 Yanbian International Academy
 Yogyakarta International Airport